Nestor Iskander's Tale on the Taking of Tsargrad (Russian: Повесть o взятии Царьграда) is a late 15th - early 16th-century Russian tale on the fall of Constantinople. It is extant in two redactions, both of which are thought to be derived from a single original now lost. The so-called 'Iskanderian' redaction, extant in a single copy, is part of an early 16th-century manuscript from the Troitse-Sergiev Monastery (Troitse-Sergiyeva Lavra collection no. 773), and includes a reference to the supposed author, Nestor Iskander. The much more common 'chronicle' redaction forms the final chapter of the Russian chronicle of 1512, and differs from the 'Iskanderian' redaction chiefly in having no reference to the author.

Historical accuracy 
The tale's historical accuracy, as compared to other accounts of the fall of Constantinople, is fairly low. The massive cannons cast by the Hungarian master Orban for the Ottomans at Adrianople are said to be cast by the walls of Constantinople. The Ottoman attempts to storm the city walls, which took place at night to minimize casualties from defensive fire, take place during the day. Arguably the most impressive event of the campaign, the Ottomans' launching of galleys into the Golden Horn by pulling them overland, is conspicuously ignored. The astronomical and meteorological events that were taken as portents of the city's fall are confounded. Contrary to the account of the tale, the Orthodox Patriarch was not present in the city during the siege, and the Byzantine empress had deceased previously. Also highly suspicious in an account claiming to be by an eyewitness is the fact that topographical details are either lacking or confused, while exact dates are few and unreliable. 

Nestor Iskander claims to be a Russian ("Iskander" being a Turkified form of "Alexander") who was captured at young age by the Ottomans, circumcised and forced to convert to Islam, though he remained a Christian at heart. He was supposedly in the Ottoman camp during the siege of Constantinople, and afterwards compiled more facts about the event from surviving Byzantine witnesses. The problem with this claim, apart from the historical inaccuracies noted above, is Iskander's command of literary language and style, which show him to be highly erudite and educated, and most probably a monk. Therefore, it is assumed that Nestor Iskander is an imaginary author, and the tale was compiled from Greek and Slavic sources. In view of this and the manifestly fictitious elements in the work, it should not be used as an historical source, particularly where, as often, it tells stories unparalleled in other sources.

Style 
The tale is remarkable for its lively narrative and detailed depictions of battle scenes. After an initial part that relates the founding of Constantinople and its significance, the siege itself is narrated in terms of the valiant but tragic defense of the Byzantines against the Ottomans, who are bound to win not because of their military strength, but because God has decided to punish the Byzantines for their former sins. The leading characters are given psychological depth, and even the Ottoman sultan Mehmet II laments his losses. The portrayal of Mehmet II following the city's fall is unusual in terms of medieval religious fanaticism, in that he is merciful to the survivors, and glorifies the Byzantines and their last emperor, Constantine XI. In all, though utterly unreliable, the tale is a masterpiece in the genre of historical fiction.

Significance 
The tale ends with reference to a Greek legend that Constantinople will eventually be liberated from heathens by a blond or fair-skinned people, but the Russian translation of this as "rusii rod" associates readily with "russkii rod," i.e. "Russian people." Thus, Nestor Iskander's tale came to be read as the first text claiming the Russians' destiny to conquer Constantinople, a theme that would become important in the 18th and 19th centuries.

References 
 Dmitriev, L. A. et al. [eds]. Biblioteka literatury drevnei Rusi: vtoraia polovina XV veka. Saint Petersburg: Nauka, 1999.
 Likhachev, D. S. [ed]. Drevnerusskaia literatura: istochnikovedenie. Leningrad: Nauka, 1984.
 Runciman, Steven. The Fall of Constantinople 1453. Cambridge: Cambridge UP, 1990.
 Terras, Victor [ed]. Handbook of Russian Literature. New Haven: Yale UP, 1985.

Pseudohistory
15th-century Russian literature
Fall of Constantinople
East Slavic literature